The South African Railways Class 3A 4-8-2 of 1910 was a steam locomotive from the pre-Union era in the Colony of Natal.

Early in 1910, the Natal Government Railways commissioned a single American-built   Mountain type locomotive, also known as the America D. It was the first superheated locomotive to be acquired by the Railways in Natal and also the first with a bar frame. In 1912, when it was assimilated into the South African Railways, it was renumbered and designated .

Manufacturer
As a result of a visit to the United States of America by Natal Government Railways (NGR) Locomotive Superintendent D.A. Hendrie in 1909 to study Mallet type locomotives and also American locomotive design in general, the American Locomotive Company (ALCO) supplied the NGR with two experimental locomotives. These engines represented a radical departure from previous NGR locomotive designs.

One of them was the first Mallet type locomotive in South Africa, later to be designated  on the South African Railways (SAR).

The other was a  Mountain type locomotive which was placed in service early in 1910. It was of very similar general proportions to the NGR Class B of 1909, also known as the Hendrie D. While the ALCO locomotive was also designated Class B, it was commonly known as the America D on the NGR and nicknamed Maud Allan by the enginemen after the Canadian-born dancer.

Characteristics
Like the Class B Hendrie D, the ALCO locomotive also used Walschaerts valve gear, but it had a bar frame, larger  diameter pistons, lower  boiler pressure, superheating, an American type cab and some other features which were typical of American design, such as high running boards. It was the first superheated locomotive to be acquired by the NGR and also the first with a bar frame.

Superheating
At the time, the advantages to be gained by superheating were gradually becoming apparent as the most practical means of improving engine power and efficiency. Superheating was considered the greatest step forward regarding improved performance and efficiency in steam locomotives. The claims that superheating could effect a saving of from 10% to 20% in fuel and from 15% to 25% in water were not unfounded and were even improved upon in later years. Experience with the Class B America D proved, when compared with the saturated steam Class B Hendrie D, that it was more economical in fuel and water consumption.

The locomotive's superheater was of the Cole type, which was somewhat similar to the Schmidt system, except that the Cole type had two headers arranged at either side of the smokebox instead of one at the top. Each of the fifteen  diameter boiler flues contained four lengths of seamless steam pipes of  outside diameter, arranged in double pairs which were connected at the back ends by return bends and with the two pairs connected to each other at the front by another return bend. This forced the steam to traverse the entire four pipe lengths before entering the steam chests. The two free front ends of each such foursome of pipes were bent around to meet the steam headers.

The passage of gases through the large flues and around the superheating pipes was controlled by a damper, which was automatically operated by a steam cylinder connected directly to the steam chest. When the throttle was opened, the pressure in the steam chest would open the damper, which would be closed again by a counterweight when steam was shut off. Superheater dampers were used for many years until it was determined that damping was unnecessary, since the life of the superheating elements was not increased appreciably by their use. On the SAR, the use of superheater dampers was discontinued c. 1924.

Factor of adhesion
The locomotive had larger diameter cylinders than the Class B Hendrie D, but its adhesive weight was  less. The result was that its factor of adhesion was found to be on the low side for the service for which it was required. The locomotive was prone to slipping when the rails were wet, which often happened in Natal when the weather was misty.

Service
The locomotive joined the Class B Hendrie D locomotives, working between Estcourt and Charlestown on the Transvaal border.

When the Union of South Africa was established on 31 May 1910, the three Colonial government railways (Cape Government Railways, NGR and Central South African Railways) were united under a single administration to control and administer the railways, ports and harbours of the Union. Although the South African Railways and Harbours came into existence in 1910, the actual classification and renumbering of all the rolling stock of the three constituent railways were only implemented with effect from 1 January 1912.

It was withdrawn from service in 1935.

References

1240
1240
4-8-2 locomotives
2D1 locomotives
ALCO locomotives
Cape gauge railway locomotives
Railway locomotives introduced in 1910
1910 in South Africa
Scrapped locomotives